Bark Along with The Young Snakes is the only EP by the Boston new wave band The Young Snakes, released in 1982. The band featured lead singer Aimee Mann, who later formed 'Til Tuesday.

Track listing
All tracks composed by Aimee Mann and Doug Vargas
"Give Me Your Face" – 3:10
"Suit Me" – 2:24
"Don't Change Your Mind" – 2:53
"The Way the World Goes" – 1:51
"Not Enough" – 2:48

Personnel
The Young Snakes
Aimee Mann - bass, vocals
Doug Vargas - guitar
Mike Evans - drums, backing vocals
with:
Dave Bass - drums (uncredited)
Michael Hausman - additional percussion

References

External links
1982 MIT Tech review of Bark Along with the Young Snakes (PDF)
[ Allmusic.com review]

1982 EPs
The Young Snakes albums